Amdrup Land is a land area in the Crown Prince Christian Land peninsula, King Frederick VIII Land, northeastern Greenland. Administratively it belongs to the NE Greenland National Park area.

Numerous fossils of the Carboniferous and Palaeozoic periods have been found in Amdrup Land, including fossil algae and fishes.

Geography
Amdrup Land is largely unglaciated. It is bound in the north by the large Flade Isblink ice cap, in the east by Antarctic Bay of the Greenland Sea and in the south by the Ingolf Fjord, on the other side of which rises Holm Land. 

The Henrik Krøyer Holme island group lies off its southeastern point. To the northwest rise the Princess Elizabeth Alps.

History
Amdrup Land was named by the 1906-1908 Denmark expedition after Georg Carl Amdrup, a member of the expedition committee.

The 1938–39 Mørkefjord expedition found numerous stone mounds which proved to be ancient Inuit meat caches at a place named Kødgravene, in the northeastern shore of Amdrup Land. Archaeological remains of an Inuit settlement were found at Sommerterrassen, north of Cape Jungersen in the SE coast.

References

External links
The prehistory of the coastal areas of Amdrup Land and Holm Land adjacent to the Northeast Water polynya: an archaeological perspective
Tectono-stratigraphic history of Northern Amdrup Land
GEUS Bulletin - Wandel Sea Basin: basin analysis - a summary
Peninsulas of Greenland